Pirthipur, Punjab is a village in the Indian state of Punjab. Located in the Ludhiana district, it is mainly driven by agriculture.

  
Villages in Ludhiana district